was a Japanese actor.

Career
Kawachi was a student at Kanto Gakuin University when Yujiro Ishihara, one of his neighbors in Zushi, Kanagawa, invited him to join the Nikkatsu studio. He made his debut in A Slope in the Sun (1958) playing Ishihara's younger brother. The studio initially sold him as one of the "Bad Trio" along with Akira Kobayashi and Tadao Sawamoto. He appeared in films by Koreyoshi Kurahara and Seijun Suzuki and is probably most known abroad for his starring roles in Kurahara's The Warped Ones (1960) and Black Sun (1964). Kawachi eventually left Nikkatsu for the Toei Company, and co-starred in the 9-film Mamushi kyōdai series with Bunta Sugawara in the 1970s. He also acted on television, with his last acting appearance being a TV mystery in 2017. He was also known for his recurring role as Inspector General Sawaii in Ultraman Tiga.

Selected filmography

Film

A Slope in the Sun (1958) - Tamio Takagi
Chi to ai no shuppatsu (1958) - Yasushi Nanjô
Wakai kawa no nagare (1959) - Yasuo Kitaoka
Kenjû 0 gô (1959) - Yoshio
Wakai keisha (1959) - Yasuo Kawase
Kaitei kara kita onna (1959) - Toshio
Otoko nara yume o miro (1959)
Kizû tsukeru yajû (1959)
Hîrusa gari no boryoku (1959)
Arashi o yobu yûjô (1959) - Kenji Kawazoe
Zassô no yô na inochi (1960) - Jun'ichi Asano
Yami ni hikaru me (1960) - Kimura Shigeo
Wataridori itsu mata kaeru (1960)
The Warped Ones (1960) - Akira
Everything Goes Wrong (1960) - Jirô Sugita
Shôjo (1961) - Yoshizô Yashiro
Aoi me no sugao (1961) - Makoto Takayama
Zurari oretacha yojinbo (1961)
Yabure kaburô (1961)
Taiyô wa kurutteru (1961)
Kitakami yakyoku (1961)
Îki te ita norâ inu (1961)
Hai tiin yakuza (1962)
Nikui an-chikushô (1963) - Hiroshi Ozaki
Ore ni kaketa yatsura (1962)
Detective Bureau 2-3: Go to Hell Bastards! (1963) - Manabe
Nanika omoroi koto nai ka (1963) - Kenji Yoshioka
Youth of the Beast (1963) - Hideo Nomoto
Gosen reiji no shutsugoku (1963)
Oka wa hanazakari (1963) - Masaya Nozaki
Ôkami no ôji (1963) - Ginji Tachibana
Red Handkerchief (1964)
Cruel Gun Story (1964) = Kenjû zankoku monogatari- TakizawaHana to dotô (1964)Kon'nichiwa akachan (1964) - Toshio TanimuraBlack Sun (1964) - AkiraOnna no uzu to fuchi to nagare (1964)Kawachi zoro: kenja jamo (1964)Kawachi zoro: doke chichu (1964)Story of a Prostitute (1965) - Pvt. Shinkichi MikamiShojo sôshitsu (1965)Kaitô X - Kubi no nai otoko (1965) - Kôji ÔsatoOtoko no monshô - ruten no okite (1965)Kawachi zoro: abare cho (1965)Kawachi Karumen (1966) - Seiji TakanoOozora ni kanpai (1966)Tokyo Drifter (1966) - Tatsuzo, The ViperNihon ninkyôden: hana no toseinin (1966)Watashi, chigatteiru kashira (1966) - YoshidaHoshi no flamenco (1966) - Tetsu WataseSâsurai ha ore no ûnmei (1966)Eiko eno chôsen (1966)Gappa: The Triphibian Monster (1967) - Hiroshi KurosakiKimi wa koibito (1967) - KawajiKanto mo hîrougozansû (1967)Outlaw: Gangster VIP (1968) - Isamu TsujikawaMusume no kisetsu (1968)Shima wa moratta (1968) - NaruseBurai: Kuro dosu (1968) - Sueo ShigeSavage Wolf Pack (1969)Zankoku onna rinchi (1969)Yôru o hirakû - onna no ichibâ (1969)Yakuza hijoshi - mushyo kyodai (1969)Shikakû rêtsuden (1969)Nobori ryu yawa hada kaicho (1969)Nihon zan kyôsen (1969)Nihon zankyô-den (1969)Ai no kaseki (1970) - JournalistHatoba onna no burusu (1970) - ChibaSakariba jingi (1970)Abarê cho han (1970)A Man′s World (1971) - FunadaYomigaeru daichi (1971) - YokoyamaSannin no onna: Yoru no cho (1971)Mamushi no kyôdai: Orei mairi (1971)Chôeki Tarô: Mamushi no kyôdai (1971)Mamushi no kyôdai: Chôeki jûsankai (1972)Mamushi no kyôdai: Shôgai kyôkatsu jûhappan (1972)Kînagashî hyâkunîn (1972)Battles Without Honor and Humanity (1973) - Kanbara SeiichiMamushi no kyôdai: Musho gurashi yonen-han (1973)Hissatsu Shikakenin (1973) - Gozamatsu no MagohachiMamushi no kyôdai: Kyôkatsu san-oku-en (1973)Gokudo VS Mamushi (1974)Mamushi no kyôdai: Futari awasete sanjuppan (1974)Mamushi to aodaishô (1975) - MasaruKigeki: Tokudashi - Himo tengoku (1975) - Giichi-sanThe Bullet Train (1975) - SatōBodo shimane keimusho (1975) - Dog breederKawachi no ossan no uta (1976)Shinjuku yoidore banchi: Hitokiri tetsu (1977)Inubue (1978) - Chief navigatorDai Nippon teikoku (1982) - FurukawaJotei (1983)Chi-n-pi-ra (1984) - OtaniKekkon annai misuterî (1985) - Masao SekineBreak Town monogatari (1985) - NiiyamaBeppin no machi (1989) - Tomizawa, Reiko's DadKagerô (1991) - Shinkichi, HashibaGorotsuki (1992)Rakuyô (1992)Shishioh-tachi no saigo (1993) - SaekiSukiyaki (1995) - Ryohel MiharaUltraman Tiga: The Final Odyssey (2000) - Inspector General Sōichirō SawaiGokudô kyôfu dai-gekijô: Gozu (2003)Waru: kanketsu-hen (2006)Superior Ultraman 8 Brothers (2008) - Secretary-General of the United Nations Sawai (final film role)

TelevisionG-Men '75 (1975) (ep1, 14, 59, 89 Guest)Ultraman Tiga (1996–1997) – Inspector General Sōichirō SawaiUltraman Dyna'' (1997–1998) – Inspector General Sōichirō Sawai

References

External links
 

20th-century Japanese male actors
1938 births
2018 deaths
People from Zushi, Kanagawa
People from Yokosuka, Kanagawa
Male actors from Kanagawa Prefecture
21st-century Japanese male actors